The Pennsylvania First Defenders were five volunteer troops from Pennsylvania that responded to U.S. President Abraham Lincoln’s call to defend the national capital of Washington, D.C., at the start of the American Civil War.  The First Defenders consisted of the National Light Infantry of Pottsville, Pennsylvania, the Washington Artillerists of Pottsville, Pennsylvania, the Ringgold Light Artillery of Reading, Pennsylvania, the Logan Guards of Lewistown, Pennsylvania and the Allen Infantry of Allentown, Pennsylvania.

History
After the Confederate States opened fire on Fort Sumter on April 12, 1861, President Abraham Lincoln issued a proclamation on April 15, calling 75,000 militia to suppress the rebellion. The first volunteer troops reached Washington, D.C. on April 18, 1861, at 6:00pm. These first troops were the Pennsylvania First Defenders and consisted of 476 officers and men. The troops were quartered in hallways and committee rooms of the United States Senate and House of Representatives. At 9:00pm that evening, the troops were brought into the basement of the Capitol where they were distributed government arms and ammunition. President Abraham Lincoln, Secretary of State, William H. Seward, and the Secretary of War, Simon Cameron, were present as the arms were being distributed. Lincoln proceeded down the line and shook hands with every member of the companies.

Casualties
En route to Washington, D.C., the troops boarded a train at Camden Station in Baltimore, Maryland – the largest city of that Slave state. In a prelude to the Baltimore Riot of 1861 that occurred a day later, they were met with an angry mob of pro-South sympathizers who threw bricks and stones at them. Many of the men received serious wounds as a result of the confrontation. Among them was sixty-five-year-old Nicholas Biddle of the Washington Artillerists who is believed to be one of the first men to shed blood in the American Civil War. As an African American in uniform, Biddle likely stood out as an easy target to the Southerners and suffered a head wound which was serious enough to expose his bone.

Recognition

In December 1864, members of the Washington Artillerists Frances P. Dewees and Samuel R. Russel wrote a letter to Congressman A. G. Curtin of Pennsylvania to outline the importance of the First Defenders' actions at the early stages of the war. They requested that the men of the First Defenders receive recognition in the form of an awarded medal.  On May 26, 1891, the General Assembly of the Commonwealth of Pennsylvania made appropriation of $1,500 for such medals of honor. On the front of each bronze medal is the image of the Capitol and the words "First in Defence of the Capitol: April 18, 1861."  On the back, each of the five First Defender companies are listed, followed by the inscription "Medal of Honor Presented by the Commonwealth of Pennsylvania", and the name of the respective soldier.

Notes

References
 A Forgotten Hero in the Civil War. Retrieved 10 June 2014.
 Hoptak, John (2007). First in Defense of the Union: The Civil War History of the First Defenders. AuthorHouse.
 Laws of the General Assembly of the Commonwealth of Pennsylvania (1891). Princeton University.
 Lossing, Benson John (1866). Pictorial History of the Civil War in the United States of America, Volume 1. 
 The 48th Pennsylvania Infantry, John Hoptak Blog
 Thompson, Heber Samuel (1910). The First Defenders.
 Ward, Leo L. (1998). First Defenders Answered Lincoln’s Call 137 Years Ago. Pottsville Republican. April 18–19, 1998

Pennsylvania in the American Civil War
History of Allentown, Pennsylvania